Marquit is a surname. Notable people with the surname include:

Deborah Marquit, American fashion designer
Erwin Marquit (1926–2015), American physicist and Marxist philosopher